David Hoyt Brainard (born 1960) is an American psychologist who researches visual perception. He is the RRL Professor of Psychology at the University of Pennsylvania, fellow of The Optical Society, Association for Research in Vision and Ophthalmology, and the Association for Psychological Science, and co-editor of the Annual Review of Vision Science.

Early life and education
David Hoyt Brainard was born in 1960 in New Haven, Connecticut. His father was former Yale University economist William Brainard and his mother is Ellen .
Brainard attended Harvard University for his bachelor's degree in physics, graduating in 1982. He then Stanford University for his master's degree in electrical engineering and doctoral degree in psychology. After his PhD, he completed post-doctoral research at Rochester University.

Career
In 1991 he was hired as an assistant professor of psychology at the University of California, Santa Barbara. He was promoted to associate professor in 1995 and full professor in 1999. In 2001 he joined the faculty of the University of Pennsylvania as a professor of psychology. From 2005 to 2010, he served as the chair of the department of psychology. In 2014, he received an endowed professorship, becoming the first recipient of the RRL Professor of Psychology. As of 2021, he is a co-editor of the Annual Review of Vision Science.

Brainard researches visual perception, visual neuroscience, and visual processing. He is interested in how vision allows perception about an object's properties, especially color.

Awards and honors
He is an elected fellow of The Optical Society, Association for Research in Vision and Ophthalmology, and the Association for Psychological Science. In 2021 The Optical Society awarded him the Edgar D. Tillyer Award for his "groundbreaking experimental and theoretical contributions to our understanding of how the visual system resolves the ambiguities inherent in sensory signals to produce a stable percept of object color".

References

Living people
1960 births
People from New Haven, Connecticut
21st-century American psychologists
Harvard College alumni
Stanford University faculty
University of California, Santa Barbara faculty
University of Pennsylvania faculty
Fellows of Optica (society)
Fellows of the Association for Psychological Science
Annual Reviews (publisher) editors
20th-century American psychologists